The Hmong people are a major ethnic group in the Minneapolis–Saint Paul area. As of 2000 there were 40,707 ethnic Hmong in the Minneapolis-St. Paul area. The 2010 U.S. Census stated there were 66,000 ethnic Hmong in Minneapolis-St. Paul, giving it the largest urban Hmong population in the world. Grit Grigoleit, author of "Coming Home? The Integration of Hmong Refugees from Wat Tham Krabok, Thailand, into American Society," wrote that the Minneapolis-St. Paul area "acted as the cultural and socio-political center of Hmong life in the U.S."

History

The Hmong, who were refugees settled in Minnesota due to the actions of voluntary agencies (VOLAGS). Minnesota had many active VOLAGS who helped Hmong people when they arrived.

The University of Minnesota Agricultural Extension Services and the Lao Family Community established farming programs for Hmong in the early 1980s. The programs ended in 1985.

In 2004 Randy Kelly, the mayor of St. Paul, traveled to Thailand with a delegation of professionals and educators, most of them Hmong, to assess a community of Hmong refugees.

As of 2006, the Minneapolis-St. Paul area was expected to receive Hmong refugees from Wat Tham Krabok in Thailand.

Demographics
Data has shown a positive trend of Hmong-Americans gradually reducing the number of Hmong-American households that are considered to be living in poverty. In 2015, data from the Pew Research Center stated that 28.3% of all Hmong-American households lived in poverty. This trend is also reflected on Minnesotan Hmong communities. The 2011 American Community Survey report stated that 31% of Hmong in the state of Minnesota were considered to be in poverty. According to the 2000 U.S. Census data, 33% of Hmong people in Minnesota were considered to be in poverty. According to the 1990 U.S. Census data, 65% of Hmong people in Minnesota were considered to be in poverty.

Sometime during 2013, Mai M. Na Lee, the author of an encyclopedia article titled "Hmong of Minnesota and California," wrote that despite a lack of official statistics, “there are reputedly many Hmong millionaires in the Twin Cities.”

As of 2013, over 50% of Hmong in the Minneapolis area owned their own houses.

Commerce
As of around 2013, the Hmong businesses in the Minneapolis-St. Paul area had revenues of over $100 million total.

As of 2011, several Hmong-owned businesses are located along West University Avenue in St. Paul.

Hmong Village, a complex with 250 merchant stalls and 20 restaurants, opened in 2009. Nine businesspeople had developed the complex.

In 2012, McDonald's introduced its first Hmong language advertising in the United States at a restaurant in  Minneapolis. However, it was unintelligible to Hmong speakers.

Institutions

By 2013, there were about ten Hmong nonprofit organizations in St. Paul.

The largest Hmong nonprofit group in the State of Minnesota is the Hmong American Partnership (HAP), headquartered in St. Paul. Founded in 1990, HAP is led by a board of up to 10 members. However, over the past few years, the group has experienced continual problems with financial oversight, which “appears to be both widespread and symptomatic of larger management struggles within HAP.” The problems were uncovered in a 2018 audit, and included issues such as:  persistent mismanagement of employee retirement accounts, failures to “provide services laid out in grant descriptions,” undisclosed revenue sources on submitted IRS forms, and “less than forthright financial practices.” Bao Vang, HAP's president and CEO who earned a base salary of $243,000 in 2017, defended her organization's practices—despite the budgetary controversies.

The Lao Family Community, headquartered in St. Paul, is the most established and oldest Hmong organization. Younger leaders began to leave the organization in the 1990s as a result of political disagreements. Mai M. Na Lee wrote that the organization “continues to monopolize festival events like the New Year's Festival and the Fourth of July Soccer Tournament.” She added that it is “not without scandal.”

The Center for Hmong Arts and Talents (CHAT), based in St. Paul, develops Hmong art and literature.

The Hmong Cultural Center is also in St. Paul.

Politics
When Choua Lee began serving as a member of the board of education of Saint Paul Public Schools in 1991, she became the first Hmong-American elected to public office in the area. The second official, Neal Thao, took Choua Lee's position in 1995. Neal Thao remained in this seat for seven years.

In 2000, Dr. Aly Xiong, a human rights activist and school principal, was the first Hmong-American to run for a Minnesota State Legislative seat, District 67B.  He lost to State Representative Sheldon Johnson, who served the east side of St. Paul for 20 years.

The Hmong Veterans' Naturalization Act of 2000 increased the number of Hmong eligible to vote, giving them more political power. In 2002, Cy Thao was elected to the Minnesota House of Representatives for District 65A and Mee Moua was elected to the Minnesota Senate for District 67.

The third Hmong-American to be elected to the St. Paul school board, Kazoua Kong-Thao, elected in 2003. Mee Moua's sister, Vallay Moua Varro, was elected to the St. Paul school board in 2009. This was the first time that two Hmong officials served concurrently on the St. Paul school board, since Kong-Thao was still in office. In 2013 Dai Thao defeated Kazoua Kong-Thao and six other candidates in a special election to become the first St. Paul City Councilmember of Hmong descent.

Mai M. Na Lee wrote circa 2013 that the Hmong have a significant political influence in St. Paul due to the size of the population. Beginning around 2000 Minnesotans campaigning for office have visited Hmong events to get the Hmong vote.

Media
The Hmong Today and Hmong Times, two Hmong newspapers, are headquartered in the Twin Cities area.

Education

As of 2000, statistics showed that 24% of Minnesotan Hmong had attained a high school diploma or its equivalent, 8% had a bachelor's degree and/or an associate degree, and 1% had a master's degree or further education. A reported 53% of Hmong in Minnesota had never received an education.

According to recorded enrollment data, the State of Minnesota had 22,000 students of Hmong origins. Minneapolis Public Schools and St. Paul Public Schools have large concentrations of Hmong students.

Minneapolis Public Schools operates the Hmong International Academy, a PreK–8 school catering to the Hmong community. There are additional Hmong-centric schools, such as the Hmong College Prep Academy, a K–12 charter school in Saint Paul. There is also the Hope Community Academy, a K–8 school located in Saint Paul that is open to all students, but has a focus on Hmong language and culture.

By 2011, increasing numbers of Hmong were attending universities and colleges. Many Hmong student associations have been formed within area universities and college campuses.

Culture and recreation
The Hmong New Year is celebrated in the metropolitan area. The 38th annual Hmong New Year in St. Paul was held in 2013.

The 41st Annual Minnesota Hmong New Year will be celebrated through the dates of November 30, 2020 to December 1, 2020 at the River Center in Saint Paul, Minnesota.

Due to the farming programs established in the 1980s, many Minnesotan Hmong had gained an interest in farming and agriculture.

Pom Siab Hmoob (Gazing into the Heart of the Hmong) Theatre, which is reportedly the world's first Hmong theater group, was formed in 1990. It is based in the Twin Cities. It is now known as the Center for Hmong Arts and Talent (CHAT).

The film Gran Torino by Clint Eastwood, though filmed in Michigan, stars five Minnesotan Hmong Americans, and the original story was based on a neighborhood in Minneapolis. It was the first mainstream U.S. film to feature Hmong Americans.

Notable people
 Mee Moua (Minnesota state senator) - She was elected in 2002. 
 Cy Thao (Minnesota state representative) - He was elected in 2002.
 Foung Hawj (Minnesota state senator) - He was elected in 2012.
 Tou Xiong was elected in Nov. 2015 as first Hmong American City Council member in Maplewood, Minnesota.
 Dai Thao (first Hmong city council member of St. Paul).
 Bee Vang (actor in Gran Torino)
 Fong Lee, fatally shot by a Minneapolis police officer in 2006
 Sunisa Lee (Gymnast, 2020 Olympic Women's All-Around champion).
 Tou Thao, police officer involved in the murder of George Floyd.

See also

Notes

Footnotes

References
 Grigoleit, Grit, M.A. (Department of American Studies, University of Passau). "Coming Home? The Integration of Hmong Refugees from Wat Tham Krabok, Thailand, into American Society" (Archive). Hmong Studies Journal. Volume 7, 2006. p. 1-22.
 Lee, Mai M. Na. "Hmong of Minnesota and California." In: Zhao, Xiaojian and Edward J.W. Park, PH.D. Asian Americans: An Encyclopedia of Social, Cultural, Economic, and Political History [3 volumes]: An Encyclopedia of Social, Cultural, Economic, and Political History (Google eBook). ABC-CLIO, November 30, 2013. , 9781598842401.
 Lor, Yang. "Hmong Political Involvement in St. Paul, Minnesota and Fresno, California" (Archive). Hmong Studies Journal. Volume 10, p. 1-53. Available at EBSCOHost
 Pfeifer, Mark E. (Hmong Cultural Center, St. Paul, Minnesota). "Hmong and Cambodians." In: R. L. Cayton, Andrew, Richard Sisson, and Chris Zacher (editors). The American Midwest: An Interpretive Encyclopedia. Indiana University Press, November 8, 2006. , 9780253003492.

Further reading
 Ngo, Bic, Martha Bigelow, and Kyla Wahlstrom (all from the University of Minnesota). "The Transition of Wat Tham Krabok Hmong Children to Saint Paul Public Schools: Perspectives of Teachers, Principals, and Hmong Parents" (Archive). Hmong Studies Journal. Volume 8, p. 1-35.

External links
 Hmong and Hmong Americans in Minnesota in MNopedia, the Minnesota Encyclopedia 
 Hmong Cultural Center in St. Paul, Minnesota
 Hmong American Partnership (HAP)
 Hmong American Mutual Assistance Association, Inc

 
Minneapolis-Saint Paul
Minneapolis-Saint Paul